Posi-Tone Records is an American jazz record label founded by Marc Free, a producer and musician who runs the company with engineer Nick O'Toole. The label's first five albums were issued in 1995.

The roster includes trombonist Steve Davis, saxophonist Ralph Bowen, guitarist Ed Cherry, trumpeter David Weiss, Jon Davis, Will Bernard, Brian Charette, Walt Weiskopf, Joe Magnarelli and Michael Dease.

Roster 

 David Ake
 William Ash
 Ehud Asherie
 David Ashkenazy
 Ernie Banks
 Will Bernard
 David Binney
 M. F. Bird 
 Steve Blackwood
 Ralph Bowen
 Peter Brendler
 Brent Canter
 Brian Charette
 Ed Cherry
 Patrick Cornelius
 Jon Davis
 Steve Davis
 Donald Dean
 Michael Dease
 Mike DiRubbo
 Benjamin Drazen
 Edwing
 Shauli Einav
 Wayne Escoffery
 John Escreet
 Orrin Evans
 Phil Farris
 Alan Ferber
 Steve Fidyk
 Ken Fowser
 Champian Fulton
 Joe Gaeta
 David Gibson
 Behn Gillece
 Jared Gold
 Noah Haidu
 Nick Hempton
 Art Hirahara
 Steve Horowitz
 Dave Juarez
 Sean Lyons
 Joe Magnarelli
 Jeremy Manasia
 Sarah Manning
 Jacám Manricks
 John Nau
 Sean Nowell
 Matthew O'Toole
 Dan Pratt
 Sam Rivers
 Jim Rotondi
 Idan Santhaus
 Second Wind
 Kenny Shanker
 Yotam Silberstein
 Alexa Tarantino
 Smokin' Toads
 Travis Sullivan
 Tom Tallitsch
 Doug Webb
 Walt Weiskopf
 David Weiss
 Spike Wilner
 Brandon Wright
 Eric Wyatt
 Sam Yahel
 Jordan Young

References

External links 
 Official site

American record labels
Jazz record labels
Record labels established in 1994